Colin White (born 27 September 1956) is a British racing driver from Glastonbury, Somerset. He currently races in the Ginetta GT4 Supercup for his own CWS Racing team. He is also known for his extensive background in stock car racing having raced in every season of ASCAR between 2001 and 2007 winning the championship in the final season. His brother Keith is also a racing driver.

Career summary

Britcar 24Hour results

References

1956 births
British racing drivers
British GT Championship drivers
Britcar 24-hour drivers
24H Series drivers
ASCAR drivers
Living people
Ginetta GT4 Supercup drivers
People from Glastonbury
Nürburgring 24 Hours drivers